Pronesopupa acanthinula is a species of small air-breathing land snail, a terrestrial  pulmonate  gastropod  mollusk  in the family Pupillidae. This species is endemic to Hawaii.

References

Molluscs of Hawaii
Pronesopupa
Gastropods described in 1892
Taxa named by César Marie Félix Ancey
Taxonomy articles created by Polbot